Bill MacDermott (May 14, 1936 – May 5, 2016) was an American gridiron football coach.  He played college football at Trinity College.  After graduating from Trinity, he spent the next 50 years as a football coach at the college and professional levels.  He was the head football coach at Wesleyan University from 1971 to 1986 and has also held coaching positions with  Cal Poly San Luis Obispo, the Orlando Thunder, San Diego Chargers, Montreal Alouettes, Winnipeg Blue Bombers, Toronto Argonauts, and Edmonton Eskimos.

Biography
A native of Providence, Rhode Island, MacDermott graduated in 1960 from Trinity College in Hartford, Connecticut.  He began his coaching career in 1961 at Hopkins School in New Haven, Connecticut.  He spent six years as the football and wrestling coach at the Hopkins School.  From 1966 to 1970, he was an assistant football coach at Wesleyan University in Middletown, Connecticut.  He was named Wesleyan's head football coach in December 1970 following the retirement of Don Russell.  He continued to hold that position through the 1986 season.  In 16 years as the head coach at Wesleyan, MacDermott compiled a record of 66–59–3.  His 66 wins rank him third among all head coaches in the history of the Wesleyan football program.  During his tenure at Wesleyan, MacDermott coached Bill Belichick, who would himself go on to have a distinguished coaching career in the NFL.  MacDermott also served as the wrestling coach at Wesleyan.

MacDermott has also been a football coach for Cal Poly San Luis Obispo, the Orlando Thunder (World League) and the San Diego Chargers (tight ends coach from 1997–1998).  He later coached in the Canadian Football League for the Montreal Alouettes, Winnipeg Blue Bombers, Toronto Argonauts, and Edmonton Eskimos.  In 2010, he took over as the head coach of the Edmonton Huskies. MacDermott died of congestive heart failure on May 5, 2016 in Edmonton.

References

1936 births
2016 deaths
American football offensive linemen
Alberta Golden Bears football coaches
Cal Poly Mustangs football coaches
Edmonton Elks coaches
Montreal Alouettes coaches
Orlando Thunder coaches
Ottawa Gee-Gees football coaches
San Diego Chargers coaches
Toronto Argonauts coaches
Trinity Bantams football players
Wesleyan Cardinals football coaches
Wesleyan University faculty
Winnipeg Blue Bombers coaches
Sportspeople from Providence, Rhode Island
Players of American football from Providence, Rhode Island